Majd or Magd is an Arabic name which means "glory" or "praise". It may refer to:

Organisations
Majd Movement, a political party in Lebanon
Al Majd SC, a former Lebanese football club
Al-Majd SC, a Syrian football club
Almajd TV Network, a Saudi Arabian television network
Algerian Movement for Justice and Development (MAJD), a political party in Algeria

People
Fouzieh Majd, Persian composer and ethnomusicologist
Mohammad Gholi Majd (born 1946), Iranian historian and author
Majd Izzat al-Chourbaji (born 1981), Syrian peace activist
Majd al-Dawla (997–1029), Iranian political leader
Majd ad-Din (disambiguation)
Majd Eddin Ghazal (born 1987), Syrian high jumper
Magd Harbasha (born 1990), Syrian basketball player
Majd Homsi (born 1982), Syrian football player
Majd Kamalmaz, American psychotherapist detained in Syria since February 2017
Majd Mastoura, Tunisian film actor and translator
Majd Shweikeh (born 1966), Jordanian businesswoman and politician

Places
Majd, Iran
Majd al-Krum, Israel
Al-Majd, Hebron

See also

Majda, a given name
Majed (disambiguation)
Magdalene (given name)